WWE Worlds Collide, also known as NXT Worlds Collide, is a professional wrestling event series produced by WWE, an American-based professional wrestling promotion. Established in 2019, the concept is interbrand competition between WWE's various brand divisions. Although the event has been held primarily for WWE's developmental territories, NXT and the former NXT UK, other brands have also been featured. The event was put on hiatus after the 2020 event but returned in 2022. The 2022 event was also the last event for NXT UK as it will be relaunched as NXT Europe in 2023.

The first event was held as a tournament in early 2019 and featured wrestlers from NXT, NXT UK, and the now-defunct 205 Live. In April that year, a four-episode streaming television series titled WWE Worlds Collide aired. In addition to the other three brands, this series also featured wrestlers from WWE's main roster brands, Raw and SmackDown. A second singular event was then held in 2020, but only featured wrestlers from NXT and NXT UK. The 2022 event was again held primarily for NXT and NXT UK, but also with a few wrestlers from Raw and SmackDown taking part.

History
In early January 2019, WWE announced an interbrand tournament to take place during the weekend of that year's Royal Rumble pay-per-view and it would stream on the WWE Network. The tournament was a two-day event, held on January 26 and 27 at the Phoenix Convention Center in Phoenix, Arizona, and aired on tape delay as a single broadcast on February 2. The event hosted a 15-man single-elimination tournament, called the Worlds Collide Tournament, which was evenly divided between the NXT, NXT UK, and 205 Live brands. The winner of the tournament received a future match for a championship of their choice, with the choices being the NXT Championship, the NXT North American Championship, NXT UK's WWE United Kingdom Championship, and 205 Live's WWE Cruiserweight Championship—the latter only being an option if the winner was within the 205 lb. weight limit.

On March 28, 2019, WWE announced that Worlds Collide would return during April's WrestleMania Axxess festival. In addition to the three brands previously featured at the Worlds Collide special, wrestlers from the Raw and SmackDown brands would also participate in the events. On April 9, WWE announced that these events would air as a four-episode streaming television series on the WWE Network titled WWE Worlds Collide, starting on April 14.

During WWE's Royal Rumble 2020 weekend announcements, WWE revealed that another Worlds Collide event would be livestreamed on the WWE Network on January 25, 2020, and broadcast from the Toyota Center in Houston, Texas, though unlike the first event, it would only feature the NXT and NXT UK brands and not also 205 Live (which would cease operations in February 2022). Also unlike the first event, there was not a Worlds Collide Tournament with a future championship opportunity at stake. Instead, the card's matches were interbrand matches pitting wrestlers from NXT against those from NXT UK.

Worlds Collide was then put on hiatus due to the COVID-19 pandemic. In October 2021, the company revealed their event calendar for 2022, and Worlds Collide was not included. Prior to this, NXT underwent a restructuring, being rebranded as "NXT 2.0", reverting to a developmental territory for WWE. However, on August 18, 2022, WWE announced the return of Worlds Collide, scheduled for September 4, and it would primarily feature NXT and NXT UK. The announcement also confirmed that the 2022 Worlds Collide would be the final event for NXT UK; following the event, the brand took a hiatus and will relaunch as NXT Europe in 2023. At the 2022 event, all of NXT UK's championships (except the NXT UK Heritage Cup) were unified into their respective NXT championship counterparts. In addition to the WWE Network in international markets, it was available to livestream on Peacock in the United States (as the American WWE Network merged under Peacock in March 2021). The 2022 event was also the final major event for NXT in which the brand was referred to as "NXT 2.0", as shortly after the event, the "2.0" moniker was dropped.

Events

References

 
Recurring events established in 2019